Bank of Bhutan (BoB) is the largest and oldest commercial bank in Bhutan. It was established under the provision of the royal charter of May 1968. It was also the only central bank before the Royal Monetary Authority of Bhutan in 1982. It is registered under the Companies Act of Bhutan, 2000 as a public sector commercial bank.

Developments and Presence

Being the largest commercial bank in Bhutan, it has its presence in every Dzongkhang or districts with over 47 branches all over Bhutan. Bank of Bhutan also introduced ATMs, Point of Sales and Internet Banking services in the country. As of July 1, 2017, the bank's assets reached 47.7 million Ngultrum (about US$750 thousand). 55% of them consist of loans, primarily consumer loans to the population and mortgages. The bank remains the largest bank in the kingdom. It accounts for 41% of deposits and 32% of loans to the economy.

Investments

Until 2007, the Bank was operated by the Ministry of Finance of Bhutan. It is managed by Druk Holding & Investments, which also manages other public sector companies.
Druk Holding & Investments is a holding company owned by the Government of Bhutan, whose task is to manage state property. The Ministry of Finance of Bhutan is the sole shareholder of the holding company. Druk Holding & Investments owns 10 state-owned companies in Bhutan, it owns at least 51% of the capital in 4 more subsidiaries, including the Bank, and minority stakes in 5 other companies.

Foreign Exchange

Bank of Bhutan is an authorized dealer of foreign exchange in Bhutan. It is authorized to trade the following currencies-
U.S. Dollar
Pound Sterling
Euro
Japanese Yen
Swiss Franc
Hong Kong Dollar
Canadian Dollar
Australian Dollar
Danish Kroner
Singapore Dollar

See also

Royal Monetary Authority of Bhutan
Ngultrum
Ministry of Finance (Bhutan)

References

Bhutan
Banks of Bhutan
Economy of Bhutan
1968 establishments in Bhutan
Organisations based in Bhutan with royal patronage
Companies based in Thimphu